David Lawrence Cremin is an American venture capitalist and co-founder of the seed stage venture capital firm DFJ Frontier.

Early career 

Beginning in 1982, Cremin recorded and performed music, first as a member of Baton Rouge (Atlantic /EastWest Records), and then as guitarist with Vincent Rocco (Elektra Records).  He then founded Vis-a-Vis Entertainment, Inc. representing and recording a number of artists including Michael Wolff (The Arsenio Hall Show, Sony Music), Downset (Mercury/Polygram Records) and For Love Not Lisa (EastWest Records).  He also produced and recorded Engines of Aggression (Priority Records) and Ether (Criminal Records).  
Subsequent to Vis-a-Vis Entertainment, Cremin began his venture capital career in 1998 co-founding Zone Ventures, an early stage venture capital firm focused on media technology ventures where he was responsible for fund management, fund raising, deal sourcing and due diligence.  While at Zone Ventures, he helped lead an investment in DivX, a video compression technology and distribution company, which completed a successful IPO (Nasdaq:DIVX, subsequently purchased by Sonic Solutions [Nasdaq: SNIC], which was purchased by Rovi [Nasdaq: ROVI]).  He also served as a trustee for The BizWorld Foundation in San Francisco from 1999–2010.

Frontier 

In 2002, Cremin co-founded Frontier with Scott Lenet and Draper Fisher Jurveston. He has helped lead investments in DivX (NASDAQ:DIVX), Prolacta Bioscience, Big Frame (DreamWorks), AudioMicro (Zealot Networks), Clear Access (Cisco), MaxPreps (CBS), among others.  Cremin currently serves on the boards of MomentFeed, UCode, Livelist, and Ticketsauce.

Educational roles 

Cremin started teaching venture capital and entrepreneurship at the Orfalea College of Business at California Polytechnic State University in San Luis Obispo in 2003; he was Adjunct Professor there until 2009.   He has helped form and served on the Advisory Board of the Entrepreneurship Center at UC Santa Barbara, where he was an Adjunct Professor from 2003 to 2010. He has guest lectured at colleges and universities across North America and in Europe.

Cremin holds a B.S. in Industrial Engineering from Stanford University.

Personal life 

Cremin is the son of Lawrence A. Cremin, a professor of education at Teachers College in New York, where he was president from 1974–1984  He was awarded a Pulitzer Prize for history in 1981 for "American Education: The National Experience, 1783-1876," the second volume of his three-volume history of U.S. schools

Cremin is the grandson of Arthur T. Cremin a serial entrepreneur, who among other things created a chain of music schools, providing inexpensive music lessons in neighborhoods across New York City, and providing frequent classical music concerts highlighting the schools’ students at various venues including Carnegie Hall.

Notes 

Living people
1960 births
American venture capitalists
California Polytechnic State University faculty
University of California, Santa Barbara faculty
Stanford University alumni
Businesspeople from New York City